John Calvin Pollock (October 5, 1857 – January 24, 1937) was a United States district judge of the United States District Court for the District of Kansas.

Education and career

Born in Belmont County, Ohio, Pollock received an Artium Baccalaureus degree from Franklin College in 1882 and read law to enter the bar in 1884. He was in private practice in Newton, Iowa from 1884 to 1885, then in Hartsville, Missouri until 1886, and then in Winfield, Kansas until 1901. He was a justice of the Supreme Court of Kansas from 1901 to 1903.

Federal judicial service

Pollock was nominated by President Theodore Roosevelt on November 25, 1903, to a seat on the United States District Court for the District of Kansas vacated by Judge William Cather Hook. He was confirmed by the United States Senate on December 1, 1903, and received his commission the same day. On January 7, 1928, President Calvin Coolidge certified Pollock involuntarily as disabled in accordance with the act of February 25, 1919, which entitled the president to appoint an additional judge for the court and provided that no successor to the judge certified as disabled be appointed. George Thomas McDermott was appointed to the additional judgeship. Pollock's service terminated on January 24, 1937, due to his death.

References

Sources
 

1857 births
1937 deaths
Justices of the Kansas Supreme Court
Judges of the United States District Court for the District of Kansas
United States district court judges appointed by Theodore Roosevelt
20th-century American judges
People from Belmont County, Ohio
People from Winfield, Kansas
United States federal judges admitted to the practice of law by reading law